Wo Ai Ni Mommy (I Love You Mommy) is a 2010 American television documentary film directed by Stephanie Wang-Breal, and distributed by P.O.V.. The documentary follows the story of a then 8-year-old Chinese girl, Fang Sui Yong, who was adopted by a Jewish Long Island family. The film had its world premiere at the San Francisco International Asian American Film Festival in 2010.

Given a new name of "Faith" by her new adopter mother, Donna Sadowsky, the film documents Faith's life just before her adoption in China, and follows her journey to America for a period of 18 months. Faith lived with her new adopted father, Jeff, as well as the Sadowsky's two biological sons and another Chinese adoptee.

"Wo Ai Ni Mommy" inspired Stephanie Wang-Breal's second feature documentary, "Tough Love," a story about two families affected by the United States child welfare system.
"Tough Love" is currently showing in festivals worldwide.

Awards
Wo Ai Ni Mommy won the Best Documentary Feature at the San Francisco International Asian American Film Festival, and the 'Sterling Award for Best U.S. Feature' at the Silverdocs. The film is nominated for an Emmy for Outstanding Informational Programming-Long Form, which will be awarded on September 26, 2011.

References

External links

Documentary films about Asian Americans
American documentary films
POV (TV series) films
Documentary films about adoption
2010 films
2010s American films